Victoria blue BO, also known as C.I. Basic Blue 7 and C.I. 42595, is a chloride salt of a dye with the chemical formula [C33H40N3]Cl.  It has the appearance of a reddish blue powder.  Victoria Blue BO base, also known as Solvent Blue 5 and C.I. 42595:1, is the hydroxide derivative of the same cation. Its chemical formula is [C33H4oN3]OH. Victoria blues are members of the triarylmethane dyes, but unlike most such dyes, the Victoria blues have a naphthylamine group.

Victoria Blue BO is used to dye anionic substrates, e.g. wool, silk, nylon, and acrylics, where bright dying is required. It is also used for staining in microscopy, where it is used to stain mitochondria. As Solvent Blue 5, it is used in some pyrotechnic compositions for blue colored smoke. It is used to dye wool and silk directly producing a violet blue colour but cotton must be mordant with tannin.

Victoria blue BO is a photosensitizer.

References

Triarylmethane dyes
Staining dyes
Solvent dyes
Naphthylamines
Anilines
Diethylamino compounds